Shipstern Bluff (also known as Devil's Point or simply Shippies) is a globally renowned big-wave surfing location on the southeastern coast of Tasmania, Australia, on the Tasman Peninsula.

Location
Shipstern Bluff is located on the southern point of the Tasman Peninsular Tasmania, near Cape Raoul. It is approximately a 30 km boat/jet ski ride from the coast to the Bluff and is regarded amongst the surfing community as one of the wildest and most dangerous locations in the world, both for the surf and the prevalence of great white sharks. The wave is also well known for its multifaceted inner formations, referred to by many of its surfers as steps, which give the wave a unique appearance and greatly adds to the challenge of surfing it.

Surfers
Some of the more notable surfers who have tackled Shipstern Bluff include:

 Laurie Towner
 Charles Condon
 Kipp Caddy 
 Kelly Slater
 Kieren Perrow
 Ross Clarke-Jones
 Andy Irons
 Richie Vaculik
 Mick Fanning
 Dave Rastovich

Favorable conditions

 Swell direction: WSW
 Wind direction: NNE at 50n
 Tide: Medium to high

It is known to hold and break from 1 metre plus in winter.

References

Coastline of Tasmania
Surfing locations in Tasmania
Tasman Peninsula